Meitanba is a rural town in Ningxiang City, Hunan Province, China. It is surrounded by Yujia'ao Township on the west, Yuejiaqiao Town on the north, Jinghuapu Township on the east, and Dachengqiao Township and Huilongpu Town on the south.

Administrative division
The town is divided into six villages and one community: 
 Meitaba Community
 Shuanglong
 Heshiqiao
 Dongshan
 Heshiqiao
 Zhuantang
 Fujia

Geography
The region abounds with coal.

Culture
Huaguxi is the most influence local theater.

Transportation
China National Highway 319 runs through the town's territory, as do Hunan Provincial Highway 206 (S206) and three county rural roads. The 1824 Provincial Highway from Jinghuapu Township, running through Meitanba Town to Taojiang County.

Attractions
Baishi Temple, built during the reign of the Ming dynasty Jiajing Emperor (r. 15211567), is a Buddhist temple in the town destroyed and rebuilt several times.

Notable individuals
(), general.

References

External links

Divisions of Ningxiang
Ningxiang